Johnson Thomas Umunnakwe Aguiyi-Ironsi   (3 March 1924 – 29 July 1966) was a Nigerian military officer who was the first military head of state of Nigeria. He seized power during the ensuing chaos after the 15 January 1966 military coup, which decapitated the country's leadership.

He ruled from 16 January 1966 until his assassination by a group of mutinous Northern Nigerian officers and men who were led by Major Murtala Mohammed and included Captain Theophilus Danjuma, Lieutenant Muhammadu Buhari, Lieutenant Ibrahim Babangida and Lieutenant Sani Abacha in a revolt against his government in what was popularly called the July counter-coup.

Early life 
Thomas Umunnakwe Aguiyi-Ironsi was born into the family of Mazi (Mr.) Ezeugo Aguiyi on the 3rd of March 1924, in Ibeku, Umuahia, Noé in Abia State, Nigeria. At the age of eight, he went to live with his older sister, Anyamma, who was married to Theophilius Johnson, a Sierra Leonean diplomat working in Umuahia. Aguiyi-Ironsi subsequently took the last name of his brother-in-law as his first name in admiration of Mr. Johnson for the father-figure role that he played in his life.

Aguiyi-Ironsi had his primary and secondary school education in Umuahia and Kano, respectively. At the age of 18, he joined the Nigeria Regiment against the wishes of his sister.

Military career
In 1942, Aguiyi-Ironsi joined the Nigerian Regiment, as a private with the seventh battalion. He was promoted in 1946 to company sergeant major. Also in 1946, Aguiyi-Ironsi was sent on an officer training course in Staff College, Camberley, England. On 12 June 1949, after completion of his course at Camberley, he received a short-service commission as a second lieutenant in the Royal West African Frontier Force, with a subsequent retroactive promotion to lieutenant effective from the same date.

Aguiyi-Ironsi was granted a regular commission on 16 May 1953 (seniority from 8 October 1947), and was promoted to captain with effect from the same date (seniority from 8 October 1951).

Aguiyi-Ironsi was one of the officers who served as equerry for Queen Elizabeth II of the United Kingdom and Nigeria when she visited Nigeria in 1956 and so he was appointed a Member of the Royal Victorian Order (MVO). He was promoted to Major on 8 October 1958.

In 1960, Aguiyi-Ironsi was made commandant of the fifth battalion in Kano, Nigeria, with the rank of lieutenant colonel.

Later in 1960, Aguiyi-Ironsi headed the Nigerian contingent force of the United Nations Operation in the Congo. From 1961 to 1962, Aguiyi-Ironsi served as the military attaché to the Nigeria High Commission in London, United Kingdom. During that period he was promoted to the rank of brigadier. During his tenure as military attaché, he attended courses at the Imperial Defence college (renamed Royal College of Defence Studies in 1961), Seaford House, Belgrave Square. He was appointed a Member of the Order of the British Empire, Military Division (MBE) in the 1962 New Year Honours list.

In 1964, he was appointed as the commandant of the entire United Nations peace keeping force in the Congo.
 
In 1965, Aguiyi-Ironsi was promoted to the rank of major general. The same year, Major General C.B. Welby-Everard handed over his position as the general officer Commanding, GOC of the entire Nigerian Army to Major General Johnson Thomas Umunnakwe Aguiyi-Ironsi, which made him the first Nigeria indigenous officer to head the entire Nigerian Army.

In January 1966, a group of army officers, led by Major Chukwuma Nzeogwu, overthrew the central and regional governments of Nigeria, killed the prime minister and tried to take control of the government in a failed coup d'état. Nzeogwu was countered, captured and imprisoned by Major General Aguiyi-Ironsi.

Aguiyi-Ironsi was named military head of state on 17 January 1966, a position he held until 29 July 1966, when a group of Northern army officers revolted against the government and killed Aguiyi-Ironsi.

Fall of the Republic 

On 15 January 1966, soldiers of mostly Igbo extraction, led by Major Chukwuma Kaduna Nzeogwu, an Igbo from Okpanam near Asaba, Noé in Delta State, eradicated the uppermost echelon of politicians from the Northern and the Western Provinces. That and other factors effectively led to the fall of the Republican Government. Aguiyi-Ironsi, an Igbo, was purportedly slated for assassination but effectively took control of Lagos, the Federal Capital Territory. Also an Igbo, President Nnamdi Azikiwe refusing to intervene to ensure the continuity of civilian rule, Aguiyi-Ironsi effectively compelled the remaining members of Balewa's government to resign. Seeing that the government was in disarray, Aguiya-Ironsi then allowed Senate President Nwafor Orizu, another Igbo who was serving as acting president in Azikiwe's absence, to surrender power to him officially, which ended the First Nigerian Republic.

Head of state
Aguiyi-Ironsi inherited a Nigeria that was deeply fractured by its ethnic and religious cleavages. None of the high-profile victims of the 1966 coup was of Igbo extraction, and the main beneficiaries of the coup were Igbo. Those facts led the north the country to believe that it had been an Igbo conspiracy. Though Aguiyi-Ironsi tried to dispel that notion by courting the aggrieved ethnic groups through political appointments and patronage, his failure to punish the coup plotters and the promulgation of the now-infamous "Decree No. 34", which abrogated the country's federal structure in exchange for a unitary one, crystallized the conspiracy theory.

During his short regime (194 days in office), Aguiyi-Ironsi promulgated a raft of decrees. Among them were the Constitution Suspension and Amendment Decree No.1, which suspended most articles of the Constitution though he left intact those sections that dealt with fundamental human rights, freedom of expression and conscience were left intact. The Circulation of Newspaper Decree No.2 removed the restrictions on press freedom that had been put in place by the preceding civilian administration. According to Ndayo Uko, the decree was to serve "as a kind gesture to the press" to safeguard himself when he went on later to promulgate the Defamatory and Offensive Decree No.44 of 1966, which made it an "offense to display or pass on pictorial representation, sing songs, or play instruments the words of which are likely to provoke any section of the country".

He also, as per the proposals of a single-man committee, passed the controversial Unification Decree No. 34, which aimed to turn Nigeria into a unitary state.

July counter coup
On 29 July 1966 Aguiyi Ironsi spent the night at the Government House in Ibadan, as part of a nationwide tour. His host, Lieutenant Colonel Adekunle Fajuyi, Military Governor of Western Nigeria, alerted him to a possible mutiny within the army. Aguiyi-Ironsi desperately tried to contact his Army Chief of Staff, Yakubu Gowon, but he was unreachable. In the early hours of the morning, the Government House, Ibadan, was surrounded by soldiers led by Theophilus Danjuma.

Assassination 
Danjuma arrested Aguiyi-Ironsi and questioned him about his alleged complicity in the coup, which saw the demise of the Sardauna of Sokoto, Ahmadu Bello. The circumstances leading to Aguiyi-Ironsi's death have remained a subject of much controversy in Nigeria. His body and that of Fajuyi were later discovered in a nearby forest.

Legend
The swagger stick with a stuffed crocodile mascot carried by Aguiyi-Ironsi was called "Charlie". Legend had it that the crocodile mascot made him invulnerable and that it was used to dodge or deflect bullets when he was on mission in the Congo. Despite the stories, the crocodile mascot probably had something to do with the fact that the name "Aguiyi" translates as "crocodile" in Igbo.

Personal life
Johnson Aguiyi-Ironsi married his wife, Victoria, in 1953. His son, Thomas Aguiyi-Ironsi, was appointed to the position of Nigeria's Defence Minister on 30 August 2006, forty years after his father's death.

Award
The Gallantry Medal was awarded by the Austrian government to Lieutenant Colonel Aguiyi-Ironsi, Maj Njoku, two expatriates and twelve Nigerian soldiers for their role in the Congo in 1960 in freeing an Austrian ambulance unit, which had beem arrested and imprisoned by the Congolese authorities because it claimed to be Belgian parachutists.

See also
 Nigerian First Republic

References

External links
Major-General Aguiyi-Ironsi visiting Ibadan the day before his assassination, July 28th 1966

1924 births
1966 deaths
People from Umuahia
Heads of state of Nigeria
Assassinated Nigerian politicians
Leaders ousted by a coup
Nigerian generals
British Army personnel of World War II
People of the Congo Crisis
Igbo politicians
People murdered in Nigeria
Assassinated heads of state
20th-century Nigerian politicians
Graduates of the Staff College, Camberley
Chiefs of Army Staff (Nigeria)
Members of the Royal Victorian Order
Members of the Order of the British Empire
1966 murders in Nigeria
Genocide perpetrators
Royal West African Frontier Force officers